Khairallah Talfah (1910 – 20 April 1993), also known as Khayr-Allah Telfah, Kairallah Tolfah, Khairallah Tolfah, or Khairallah Tilfah, was an Iraqi Ba'ath Party official, and the maternal uncle and father-in-law of Saddam Hussein. He was the father of Sajida Talfah, Saddam's first wife, and of Adnan Khairallah, defence minister. Saddam appointed Khairallah Talfah mayor of Baghdad, but he was forced to remove Khairallah from office due to corruption.

Background
Khairallah was born in 1910 in the village of Al-Awja, 5 km south of Tikrit, and then part of the Baghdad Vilayet of the Ottoman Empire. He was grandson of Musalat ibn Omar Bey III, al-Bu Nasir tribal leader and martyr of the anti-Ottoman resistance.

Career

Khairallah, a teacher and an Arab nationalist, was a member of the al-Jawwal society and later participated as an Iraqi Army Officer in the Army revolt of 1941 led by Rashid 'Ali Al-Gaylani against the Iraqi Royal institution supported by the occupying British forces. The revolt did not achieve any major changes, with the British dispatching a taskforce which occupied the country and re-installed the ousted pro-British Regent 'Abd al-Ilah. Many Iraqi soldiers who had participated in the revolt were pardoned, largely keeping their ranks and military position. Khairallah was expelled from the army and spent six years in prison for his part in the revolt.

He would later play a role in the founding of the anti-British and Arab nationalist Iraqi Independence Party. He was released from prison in 1947. Following his release he returned to Tikrit, where his nephew Saddam Hussein moved back in with him and began school. Saddam had previously lived with Khairallah  prior to the 1941 coup and subsequent war, but had moved back in with his parents during Khairallah's imprisonment. Unlike Khairallah, Saddam's mother and step-father beat him and prevented him from receiving an education.

He became the Governor of Baghdad in 1958, he became a member of the Higher Education and Scientific Research Council in 1972, and he served as head of the Civil Service Board from 1973 to 1982.

He became President of the Association of Veteran Warriors جمعية المحاربين القدماء after the Baath party seized power in 1968.

He collected a considerable amount of wealth by using his influence as a close relative of both Ahmed Hassan al-Bakr and Saddam Hussein. He formed a retail and property organization which was widely known as the Khairallah Talfah Society . One of the society's greatest money generating schemes was buying worthless farmland on the outskirts of cities where residential land was in very short supply, dividing the farmland into thousands of residential plots, then selling the plots to people and making high profits as a result, the plots were usually sold to members of the military, police officers, teachers, and other government workers.

He headed the War Veterans Society (Veteran Warriors or the Khairallah Talfah Society, جمعية خير الله طلفاح as it was commonly named). With the huge shortages of almost all consumer goods that became the new phenomena soon after the Baath Party took power on 17 July 1968, the Khairallah Talfah Society جمعية خير الله طلفاح imported goods at dinar/dollar rates which were heavily subsidized and then it made a considerable profit by selling these same goods to very grateful people.

Views, health and personal life

When he became Mayor of Baghdad in the early 1970s, he neglected to perform his other duties because he preoccupied himself by imposing his personal standards of "morality" and "righteous behaviour on other people". He ordered the security service and the police force to spray paint the legs of any woman who was caught wearing short skirts, and he also ordered them to tear the bell-bottom trousers which were worn by all males and females. These trousers were fashionable at the time. These actions against any "Westernised" contemporary trends only lasted a few weeks because they were abruptly terminated, they were probably terminated when Vice-President Saddam Hussein intervened. These "trendy" fashions subsequently spread all over the country and they were even indulged in by Khairallah's own sons and daughters.

Shortly before his death, his leg(s) were amputated because he was suffering from diabetes.

Family

His sons and daughters were known to behave like miniatures of their father. It was alleged that they could be quite unpleasant to people, expecting others to show obedience, deference and acknowledge their superiority.

His daughter Ilham إلهام (born 1955 and later died of cancer) was schooled in the famously good and strict Christian convent girls' school of Rahibat Al-Taqdomah مدرسة راهبات التقدمة. Ilham was the half-sister of Sajida (Saddam's wife) and Adnan Khairallah (Defence Minister).

The daughters of President Ahmed Hassan al-Bakr were in that school راهبات التقدمة before Ilham. Al-Bakr's daughters were known to have been very well behaved, mingling seamlessly with all others and not showing any of the superiority and arrogance that became the usual behaviour of Khairallah Talfah's daughter Ilham. It is reported that Ilham disagreed with a Kurd girl's opinion in a religious education lesson; then the secret service, sent by her father Khairallah the next morning, arrested the young girl who was then reportedly released after a few days but never joined the school again. Ilham was reportedly saying that she had to get her arrested to teach her and any other person who dares to "behave inappropriately" a good lesson.

Ilham married Ahmed Hassan al-Bakr's son, only to divorce from him as soon as Saddam took power from al-Bakr, allegedly through the influence of her father Khairallah. Ilham then married Watban وطبان, Saddam's half brother.

Khairallah Talfah's son Lou'ay لؤي was shot with a hand gun in 1983 while in the resort of Habbaniya. The bullet fractured his femur and an emergency surgery to fix the fracture with a plate and screws was performed in Rasheed Military Hospital in Baghdad on the same night. He made a full recovery after a few weeks' stay in Rasheed Military Hospital Officers' Fracture ward. The surgery was performed by Major General Doctor Moflih Al-Dulaimi اللواء الطبيب مفلح فارس الدليمي اختصاصي جراحة العظام والكسور who happened to have been on-on call that night. The circumstances of the shooting were not clear, but he claimed that it had been an accidental shooting while cleaning the gun. However, no gunpowder wounds وشم بارودي were reported to have been seen on the entry wound by the surgeons. This means that the gun was unlikely to have been fired within 90 cm of the injured, and therefore, it could not have been self-inflicted.

Family ties
He had strong family ties with the highest Iraqi power figures:

 He was Ali Hassan al-Majid's brother in law (Khairallah was married to Ali's sister Fatima).

 His daughter Ilham married Haytham (Al-Bakr's eldest son), only to divorce when Al-Bakr lost power to Saddam Hussein then married Watban (Saddam's half brother).
 He was Saddam Hussein's uncle (Saddam's mother was his sister Sabha).
 He was Saddam's father in law (Saddam Hussein was married to Khairiallah's daughter, Sajida).

References

1919 births
1993 deaths
Anti-Iranian sentiments
Arab Socialist Ba'ath Party – Iraq Region politicians
Iraqi Arab nationalists
Iraqi Sunni Muslims
Mayors of Baghdad
Place of birth missing
Place of death missing
Tulfah family